The Sicarii were a self-defense splinter group of Hebrew zealots who opposed the Roman occupation of Judea in the decades preceding the destruction of Jerusalem in 70 CE.

Sicarius, sicarii or sicari may also refer to:

 Sicarii (1989), a Jewish terrorist group in Israel
 Sikrikim or Sicarii, members of an ultra-orthodox modern Israeli sect
 Sicaricon, the Roman-era laws concerning the usurping occupant of lands in Judea
 Saint Sicarius or Sicharius, the name of several Christian saints
 Sicarius of Brantôme, a child saint
 Sicarius (spider), a genus of venomous spiders belonging to the family Sicariidae
 Vincenza Sicari, an Italian long-distance runner

See also 

 Sica
 Sicario (disambiguation)